Percival "Percy" Hubert Hickey (28 April 1899 – 21 December 1943) was a New Zealand rugby union player who represented the All Blacks in 1922. His position of choice was wing three-quarter.

Career 

Hickey was born in Rahotu in 1899. He made the  provincial side in 1919.

He was selected for the North against South Island match in 1922. He scored a try. He was then selected for the national side on their tour of New South Wales.

Hickey played in two of the possible five matches. He played both of these games out of his regular position. In his second match against New South Wales, Hickey was judged to have committed an obstruction offence and conceded a penalty try. This was considered a part of the 14-8 defeat.

Hickey did not again play for Taranaki nor be chosen for the All Blacks.

However, in 1925 Hickey moved down to Wellington and joined the Poneke club. He made the  provincial team that same year.

He later moved further south to Dunedin and then Double Bay, Australia.

Personal 
Hickey's wife's name was Winnifred. She worked as a barman in Wellington.

References 

1899 births
1943 deaths
New Zealand international rugby union players
New Zealand rugby union players
Rugby union players from Taranaki
Rugby union three-quarters